Sam Querrey was the defending champion, but chose not to participate this year. Then World No. 2 Novak Djokovic collected his 27th consecutive win of the year winning the title by beating Feliciano López in the final 7–6(4), 6–2.

Seeds
The first four seeds received a bye in to the Second Round.

Qualifying

Draw

Finals

Top half

Bottom half

References
Main Draw
Qualifying Draw

Serbia Open - Singles
Serbia Open